Sir Edward Philip Antrobus, 8th Baronet (born 28 September 1938) is a South African former first-class cricketer.

Personal
Born in South Africa, he graduated from Witwatersrand University in 1961 with a Bachelor of Science in engineering. He graduated from Magdalene College, Cambridge in 1965 with a Bachelor of Arts and in 1969 with a Master of Arts. He succeeded to the title of 8th Baronet Antrobus, of Antrobus, county palatine of Chester on 1 August 1995.

Cricketing career
Antrobus made two appearances for Cambridge University in 1963 as a right-handed batsman and leg spin bowler. He scored 31 and 22 on debut against Leicestershire but was twice out without scoring in his second, and final, game against Nottinghamshire. He bowled three overs in total without taking a wicket. His uncle, Geoffrey Antrobus, also played two games for Cambridge University in 1925.

References

1938 births
Cambridge University cricketers
Living people
South African cricketers
Alumni of Magdalene College, Cambridge
Baronets in the Baronetage of the United Kingdom
University of the Witwatersrand alumni